Oreophrynella cryptica is a species of toad in the family Bufonidae.

Its natural habitat is subtropical or tropical moist montane forests.

It is endemic to Auyan-tepui, Venezuela, and is classed as vulnerable because of its restricted range.

Sources

Oreophrynella
Endemic fauna of Venezuela
Amphibians described in 1995
Taxa named by Josefa Celsa Señaris
Taxonomy articles created by Polbot
Amphibians of the Tepuis